Ralph Bean (born 20 May 1980) is a retired Bermudian international footballer who most recently coached local side North Village Rams.

Club career
Bean played college soccer in the United States with William & Mary Tribe and played for Bermudian side North Village Rams before joining Bermuda Hogges in 2007. He returned to North Village after deciding not to renew his contract.

International career
Bean made his debut for Bermuda in a December 2003 friendly match against Barbados and earned a total of 14 caps, scoring 3 goals. He has represented his country in 5 FIFA World Cup qualification matches.

His final international match was a June 2008 World Cup qualification match against Trinidad and Tobago.

International goals
Scores and results list Bermuda's goal tally first.

Managerial career
Bean was named coach of North Village Rams in January 2013, replacing Shaun Goater. He resigned in April 2015.

Honours

Player 
North Village Rams

 Bermudian Premier Division: 2005–06, 2010–11
 Bermuda FA Cup: 2003–04, 2004–05, 2005–06

References

External links

articles.dailypress.com

1980 births
Living people
Association football midfielders
Bermudian footballers
Bermuda international footballers
William & Mary Tribe men's soccer players
North Village Rams players
Bermuda Hogges F.C. players
USL Second Division players
Bermudian expatriate footballers
Expatriate soccer players in the United States
Bermudian football managers